David G. Near is a justice in the Federal Court of Appeal of Canada.

References 

Judges of the Federal Court of Canada
Living people
Year of birth missing (living people)